Hondo Maclean was a hardcore punk outfit from Bridgend, Wales.

History
Taking their name from a character in 1980s cartoon series M.A.S.K., Hondo Maclean emerged from the South Wales hardcore scene to wider recognition, including touring with former Jackass star Steve-O and engaging in their own headline tour.

They released two EPs and one full-length album, with plans to release a second before they decided to disband in early February, 2007.

Since Hondo Maclean broke up, former members Gavin Borrough and Rich Boucher have both joined Funeral for a Friend, albeit at different times. Also of note is that Johnny Phillips, who drummed for a previous incarnation of Hondo Maclean named Mongrel, was a founding member of Funeral for a Friend.

In of July 2011, a one-night-only reunion show by Hondo Maclean was announced. The show was arranged for the 30th of December 2011, but tickets promptly sold out, causing the band to arrange another show for the 29 December.

In November 2014, the band released 300 vinyl exclusive copies of The Truth; The Fiction; their second studio album. The album was recorded over six years previously while the band were going under the name of The Future.

Former members
 Michael Davies – Vocals
 Rhys Jenkins – Guitar
 Ryan Richards – Drums 
 Grant Robinson – Drums

Discography

EPs
 Finding Joy (2002)
Plans for A Better Day (2003) (Mighty Atom)
Chasing Angels (2003) (Mighty Atom)

Albums
Unspoken Dialect (2005) (Mighty Atom)
The Truth; The Fiction (2014)

References
BBC Wales: Review of "Unspoken Dialect"
BBC Wales profile on Hondo Maclean
Rock3 Radio Network – Hondo Maclean: an Album review of Unspoken Dialect

External links
Hondo Maclean on MySpace
Hondo Maclean on PureVolume
Mighty Atom: Hondo Maclean
The Future

Musical groups established in 2001
Musical groups disestablished in 2007
Welsh heavy metal musical groups
British post-hardcore musical groups
British alternative metal musical groups
People from Bridgend